Pramod Dattaram Kode (born 13 February 1953) usually referred to as PD Kode, is Additional Judge of Bombay High Court. Prior to that, he was the designated judge of the Terrorist and Disruptive Activities (Prevention) Act court that dealt with the 1993 Bombay Bombings case. The case is the longest criminal case in India's history. Judge Kode allowed some of the accused to go on the Haj pilgrimage. He took no leave from March 1996 until June 2007. He is noted for not missing court sessions when he broke his arm after slipping in his bathroom, nor when his parents died. Kode is a Hindi film enthusiast and is fond of computer games.

He was elevated to the Bombay High Court as an Additional Judge on 10 February 2009.

He is making his movie debut in the Shailendra Pandey's upcoming Hindi feature film, JD, based on a journalist's life.

References 

20th-century Indian judges
Living people
1953 births
Judges of the Bombay High Court